Kollektiv Turmstraße is a German musical duo consisting of Christian Hilscher and Nico Plagemann. Established in 1998 in Hamburg, they released tracks on various compilation albums before producing their own album Verrückte Welt in 2006. This was followed by Rebellion der Träumer in 2010. The duo's musical style can be broadly labeled as minimal techno.

The duo has performed at such festivals as Melt, Homerun, Off Week and Distortion.

Discography

Albums
 2006: Verrückte Welt (No Response)
 2010: Rebellion der Träumer (Connaisseur Recordings)
 2013: Musik Gewinnt Freunde Collection

EPs and singles
 2004: New Weakness EP (No Response)
 2006: Disconnect Me (Ostwind Records)
 2006: Musik gewinnt Freunde (Musik Gewinnt Freunde)
 2007: Abenteuer Alltag EP (Diynamic Music)
 2007: Farbenlehre (Musik Gewinnt Freunde)
 2007: Grillen im Park (Ostwind Records)
 2007: Tristesse (Connaisseur Recordings)
 2008: Blutsbrüder (Musik Gewinnt Freunde)
 2008: Holunderbaum EP (Musik Gewinnt Freunde)
 2008: Mondscheinprimaten (Baalsaal Music)
 2009: Like The First Day EP (Diynamic Music)
 2009: Luechtoorn EP (Musik Gewinnt Freunde)
 2009: Melodrama Remixes (Ostwind Records)
 2010: Grillen im Park Remixes (Ostwind Records)
 2010: Rebellion der Träumer (Connaisseur Recordings)
 2012: Ordinary EP (Musik Gewinnt Freunde)
 2015: Sry I'm Late EP (Diynamic Music)
 2019: Ribbon Reef EP (Musik Gewinnt Freunde)
 2022: YAP EP (Not Sorry Music)

References

External links  

German electronic music groups
Musical groups from Hamburg
German musical duos
Electronic music duos
1998 establishments in Germany